Orange Vale, also known as the Lawler-Whiting House, is a Greek Revival plantation house completed in 1854 near Talladega, Alabama. The house was the centerpiece of a  cotton plantation, a forced-labor farm worked by black people enslaved by the land's white owners.

The house is principally associated with Levi Lawler, an Alabama state legislator, who principally used it during the summer. The house is a formal two-story frame structure with a hexastyle square-columned portico across the front, supporting a heavy paneled entablature. There is no pediment. The hipped roof is flanked by interior chimneys. Small flat-roofed one-story pavilions flank the house on either side and extend beyond the rear of the house. The rear has two-level porches across the width. The interior has a center-hall plan with the hall extending to the back porch.  remain of the original property, with seven other buildings.

Orange Vale was listed on the National Register of Historic Places on May 22, 1986.

References

External links

 

Houses on the National Register of Historic Places in Alabama
Greek Revival architecture in Alabama
Houses completed in 1852
National Register of Historic Places in Talladega County, Alabama
Historic American Buildings Survey in Alabama
Plantation houses in Alabama
Cotton plantations in the United States
1852 establishments in Alabama